The Lost Files is a series of three radio dramas released prior to the fourth series of Torchwood, a British science fiction television series which airs on the BBC. These dramas aired as BBC Radio 4's Afternoon Play on the 11,12 and 13 July 2011 and feature the regular cast. Although broadcast to coincide with the airing of Torchwood: Miracle Day, two of the episodes are set prior to the Torchwood: Children of Earth miniseries of 2009, as they include the character of Ianto Jones, who is killed off in the 2009 miniseries. The episode "The House of the Dead", however, is set right before "Children of Earth"'s epilogue.

References

External links
Torchwood Website
Torchwood Radio Play

Radio plays based on Torchwood
2011 radio dramas
2011 audio plays